Chrissie is a feminine given name. Notable people with the name include:

Chrissie Hynde (born 1951), American rock musician
Chrissie Maher, founder of the Plain English Campaign
Chrissie Swan (born 1973), Australian radio presenter
Chrissie Wellington (born 1977), English world champion triathlete

Fictional characters
Chrissie Jackson, in the science fiction series The Sarah Jane Adventures
Chrissie Latham, in the Australian soap opera, Prisoner
Chrissie Watts, in the soap opera EastEnders
Chrissie White, in the soap opera Emmerdale

See also
Chrissy

English-language feminine given names
Feminine given names